Azhar is an Arabic male or female name that means Radiant, Shining, Luminous, Brilliant or Clear.

It is used as a given name:
 Azhar Khan (born 1955), Pakistani cricketer
 Azhar Mahmood (born 1975), Pakistani cricketer
 Azhar Saeed (born 1970), Pakistani cricketer
 Azhar Hussain (born 1984), Pakistani wrestler
 Azhar Ali (born 1985), Pakistani cricketer
 Azhar Usman (born 1975), American comedian

Used as a surname:
 Masood Azhar (born 1968), Pakistani mujaheddin
 Mohammad Azharuddin (born 1963), Indian cricketer

See also
Azhari (name)

References

Arabic feminine given names
Arabic masculine given names
Arabic-language surnames
Urdu feminine given names
Urdu masculine given names
Pakistani feminine given names
Pakistani masculine given names